Sphingomonas xinjiangensis  is a Gram-negative, aerobic and motile bacteria from the genus of Sphingomonas, which has been isolated from the desert sand of Xinjiang in China.

References

Further reading

External links
Type strain of Sphingomonas xinjiangensis at BacDive -  the Bacterial Diversity Metadatabase	

xinjiangensis
Bacteria described in 2011